Kalimpong Girls' High School is an all girls' school, affiliated under the West Bengal Council of Higher Secondary Examination boarding school located in the hill town of Kalimpong in the district of Darjeeling, West Bengal, India.  It was founded in 1890. GHS (as it is commonly referred to), is run under the Diocese of the Eastern Himalayas (C.N.I).

Kalimpong Girls' High School is affiliated to the WBCHSE Board, West Bengal, and is listed at index number 28 of the Higher Secondary Schools in Darjeeling District. KGHS offers the streams, Arts, Commerce & Science at the Higher Secondary Level. It provides education from classes nursery to XII with boarding facilities.

History 
Kalimpong Girls' High School was established in 1890, and is one of the oldest schools of Kalimpong. It is affiliated to the West Bengal Council of Secondary Education.
The List of The Principals are: 
 Miss Catherine Graham - Founder
 Miss Lily Waugh 1889
 Miss Eddie Smith 1909- 1933 
 Miss C. Macintosh 1933 - 1947
 Miss H. Hebbington 1948 - 1954
 Miss E.S Scrim Guer 1955 - 1966
 Miss L.W Rongong 1967 - 1996 
 Mrs. Sulemin Sompu Pradhan 1998 – present

Source:

See also
Education in India
List of schools in India
Education in West Bengal

References

External links

Girls' schools in West Bengal
Boarding schools in West Bengal
Primary schools in West Bengal
High schools and secondary schools in West Bengal
Schools in Darjeeling district
Kalimpong
Educational institutions established in 1890
1890 establishments in India